The two-man bobsleigh competition at the 2014 Winter Olympics in Sochi, Russia was held at the Sliding Center Sanki near Krasnaya Polyana, Russia on 16–17 February.

On 24 November 2017, the IOC imposed a life ban on bobsledder Alexandr Zubkov. He was stripped of 2 gold medals (two-man and four-man bobsleigh). On 18 December 2017, Zubkov's two-man bobsleigh teammate Alexey Voyevoda also received a lifetime ban by the IOC due to doping violations at the 2014 Winter Olympics. On 29 November 2017, IOC also sanctioned Alexander Kasjanov for doping offences and stripped his team of their results. The IOC requested that the FIBT modify the results, and the medals were redistributed accordingly.

Records
While the IOC does not consider bobsled times eligible for Olympic records, the FIBT does maintain records for both the start and a complete run at each track it competes.

Results

References

Bobsleigh at the 2014 Winter Olympics
Men's bobsleigh at the 2014 Winter Olympics
Men's events at the 2014 Winter Olympics